Social engagement (also social involvement, social participation)    refers to one's degree of participation in a community or society.

Definitions
Prohaska, Anderson and Binstock (2012) noted that the term social engagement is commonly used to refer to one's participation in the activities of a social group. The term has been defined by Avison, McLeod and Pescosolido (2007) as "the extent to which an individual participates in a broad range of social roles and relationships." and by Zhang, Jiang, and Carroll as "the commitment of a member to stay in the group and interact with other members".

Prohaska, Anderson and Binstock (2012) noted that the term has not always been used consistently in literature, and can be sometimes confused with several other similar (but distinct) concepts from social sciences. Social engagement is different from the concept of a social network, as social network focuses on a group, rather than the activity. They similarly note the difference between social engagement and social capital, the latter defined as "resources available to individuals and groups through their social connections to communities". Civic engagement is also different, as it refers to political activity, membership and volunteering in civil society organizations.

Characteristics
Social engagement is related to participation in collective activities, which reinforces social capital and social norms. Key elements of social engagement include activity (doing something), interaction (at least two people need to be involved in this activity), social exchange (the activity involves giving or receiving something from others), and lack of compulsion (there is no outside force forcing an individual to engage in the activity). For the most part, social engagement excludes activities for which one is getting paid, or family obligations.

A common metric of social engagement is the quantifiable volume of activity. A traditional form of social engagement, such as church going, may be measured by the number of one's visits to the church. In the Internet setting a metric of social engagement on a discussion board may take the form of the number of posts made.

One of the main topics in studying social engagement by social scientists has related to whether individuals are more or less engaged with various communities. Some studies have suggested that modern information and communication technologies have made it easier for individuals to become socially engaged in more distant or virtual communities, and thus have decreased their involvement in local communities (see also Bowling Alone).

Promotion of positive behavior in and opportunities for social engagement also serve as key goals in the field of positive youth development.

Health 
High social engagement has been identified with improved happiness and health and well-being; however, context is important. High social engagement in deviant, delinquent activities such as membership in a criminal organization can be detrimental to one's health, as can be being too involved (having too many social roles), which can lead to stress due to conflicts between roles.

Covid-19 has added a new level to social engagement which has relied heavily on face-to-face interactions to compliment the social media engagement when it comes to Social Grouping. In article written by (Elsayed W. 2021, 30 November) "Children are among the social groups most affected by the COVID-19 pandemic because they have found themselves forced to stay at home, far from their schoolmates, their friends, and far from all the activities they used to do before the pandemic".Covid-19 pandemic and its impact on increasing the risks of children's addiction to electronic games from a social work perspective

Social Engagement and Poverty 
Poverty is a social problem that can greatly impact one’s ability to engage in the occupation of social participation. The World Federation of Occupational Therapists fully endorses the UN Universal Declaration of Human Rights. Global conditions that threaten the right to occupation include poverty, disease, social discrimination, displacement, natural and man-made disasters and armed conflict. In addition, the right to occupation is subject to cultural beliefs and customs, local circumstances and institutional power and practices. WFOT strongly condemns any action or circumstance that infringes the rights of all human beings to live purposeful and engaged lives and to go about their daily business in safety and peace. Engagement in social activities can be impacted by an individual’s employment or the lack of it.

Additionally, the global conditions to threaten the right to occupation have been addressed specifically for individuals with disabilities. The Convention on the Rights of Persons with Disabilities also highlights the requirement to promote, protect, and ensure the full enjoyment of human rights by persons with disabilities. Articles 4–32 define the rights of persons with disabilities and the obligations of states parties towards them. Rights specific to this convention include the rights to accessibility including the information technology, the rights to live independently and be included in the community (Article 19), to personal mobility (article 20), habilitation and rehabilitation (Article 26), and to participation in political and public life, and cultural life, recreation and sport (Articles 29 and 30). In addition, parties to the Convention must raise awareness of the human rights of persons with disabilities (Article 8), and ensure access to roads, buildings, and information (Article 9). Poverty and limited access to the occupation of social participation is an occupational injustice.

Occupational justice requires universal rights to occupation, broadly defined and recognising differences related to the cultural, social, political (current and historic) and geographical context. Occupational justice is the fulfilment of the right for all people to engage in the occupations they need to survive, define as meaningful, and that contribute positively to their own well-being and the wellbeing of their communities (WFOT, 2019). Occupational justice requires occupational rights for all to:
 Participate in a range of occupations that support survival, health and well-being so that populations, communities, families and individuals can flourish and realise their potential, consistent with the Ottawa Charter 
 Choose occupations without pressure, force, coercion, or threats but with acknowledgement that with choice comes responsibility for other people, lifeforms and the planet 
 Freely engage in necessary and chosen occupations without risk to safety, human dignity or equity.

Areas of Work: Social Inclusion in United Nations 

In all stages of policy formulation, social inclusion is critical to ensure that the needs of disadvantaged social groups such as indigenous peoples, persons with disabilities, older persons, youth and women, are considered so that no one is left behind. UN DESA assists countries develop policies that address social vulnerability dimensions – including gender, income group, and rural-urban disparities – by training government to the use of new methodologies for data collection and mechanisms for the participation of all disadvantaged groups (United Nations, n.d.).

Key tools to build capacity in the area of social inclusion include:

 Provision of high-quality advisory services and technical expertise on social policy issues to governments and other relevant stakeholders, including through scoping missions, as well as analysis of existing legislative and policy frameworks in relation to relevant international instruments on social development;
 Developing robust methodologies in capacity needs assessment, results-based management and monitoring and evaluation of social policies;
 Methodologies for data collection on disadvantage social groups such as indigenous people, youth, women, older persons and persons with disabilities to facilitate evidence based policy formulation, implementation, monitoring and reporting;
 Analysis of social impact and inequality (including income and rural urban inequalities);
 Toolkit on Disability for Africa: its aim is to implement the Convention on the Rights for Persons with Disabilities.

Convention on the Rights of Persons with Disabilities (CRPD) by United Nations 
The Convention on the Rights of Persons with Disabilities and its Optional Protocol was adopted on 13 December 2006 at the United Nations Headquarters in New York, and was opened for signature on 30 March 2007. There were 82 signatories to the Convention, 44 signatories to the Optional Protocol, and 1 ratification of the Convention. This is the highest number of signatories in history to a UN Convention on its opening day. It is the first comprehensive human rights treaty of the 21st century and is the first human rights convention to be open for signature by regional integration organizations. The Convention entered into force on 3 May 2008.

The Convention follows decades of work by the United Nations to change attitudes and approaches to persons with disabilities. It takes to a new height the movement from viewing persons with disabilities as “objects”  of charity, medical treatment and social protection towards viewing persons with disabilities as “subjects” with rights, who are capable of claiming those rights and making decisions for their lives based on their free and informed consent as well as being active members of society.

The Convention is intended as a human rights instrument with an explicit, social development dimension. It adopts a broad categorization of persons with disabilities and reaffirms that all persons with all types of disabilities must enjoy all human rights and fundamental freedoms. It clarifies and qualifies how all categories of rights apply to persons with disabilities and identifies areas where adaptations have to be made for persons with disabilities to effectively exercise their rights and areas where their rights have been violated, and where protection of rights must be reinforced.

The Convention was negotiated during eight sessions of an Ad Hoc Committee of the General Assembly from 2002 to 2006, making it  the fastest negotiated human rights treaty.

https://www.un.org/disabilities/documents/convention/convention_accessible_pdf.pdf

Occupational Therapy and Social Engagement 
Occupational therapy is a client-centred health profession concerned with promoting health and well being through occupation. The primary goal of occupational therapy is to enable people to participate in the activities of everyday life. Occupational therapists achieve this outcome by working with people and communities to enhance their ability to engage in the occupations they want to, need to, or are expected to do, or by modifying the occupation or the environment to better support their occupational engagement (WFOT 2012). Occupational therapists work in a variety of settings, and focus on occupation through an individualized client-centered approach, which may include supporting individual participation in activities of daily living, instrumental activities of daily living, rest and sleep, education, work, play, leisure, and social participation (Occupational Therapy Practice Framework: Domain & Process).

Socially engaged theater
Socially engaged theater is performance work that comments on or raises awareness about social issues around race, gender, disability sexuality and equality. The audience is invited to participate in aspects of the performance.

Community Based Rehabilitation by WFOT 
This position implies that occupational therapists engage in coalitions with people who experience disabilities, their families and communities, advocating with them and for their issues, sharing individual experiences and enabling professional organizations to support people with disabilities' social engagement needs and rights of dignity and inclusion, in both developing and developed societies. WFOT recognizes that there is a wide range of opinions and philosophies about what community based rehabilitation (CBR) actually is or what it should be. CBR can cover very diverse disability related practices. This paper is based on the understanding of CBR as a strategy within community development for the rehabilitation, equalization of opportunities and social integration of people with disabilities. Occupational therapists are developing a critical awareness and understanding about these realities, guided and informed by new notions, such as occupational apartheid occupational deprivation and occupational justice. Occupational therapists are committed to advance certain core principles, one of which is the right of all people-including people with disabilities-to develop their capacity and power to construct their own destiny through occupation, which seems congruent with the basic tenets of CBR. practice-research-education projects in CBR.

See also
 Civic engagement
 Community engagement
 Engaged hermeneutics
 Positive youth development
 Vocational Rehabilitation
 Occupational Therapy 
 Occupational Therapist
 Convention on the Rights of Persons with Disabilities

References

Community
Sociological terminology